Mansonia (Mansonioides) annulifera is a species of zoophilic mosquito belonging to the genus Mansonia.

Distribution
It shows a wide range of distribution from east to west. It is found in Australia, Bangladesh, Cambodia, India, Indonesia, Laos, Malaysia, Myanmar, Nepal, New Guinea (Island); Papua New Guinea, Philippines, Sri Lanka, Thailand and Vietnam.

Behavior
It is an endophilic species, prefer to rest indoor places. Adults normally active in one after midnight and before dawn.

Medical importance
It shows high affinity for human biting and is a potent vector of Brugia malayi to cause Malayan filariasis. In 1980, Japanese encephalitis virus was isolated from M. annulifera from India, which was the first isolation of the virus from this mosquito.

References

External links
Natural Mortality of Mansonia annulifera with Special Reference to Mortality due to Brugia malayi Infection and Distribution of Parasites in a Vector Population
Semiochemicals of Mansonia annulifera
Photos of M. annulifera
Host-Feeding Pattern of Culex quinquefasciatus Say and Mansonia annulifera (Theobald) (Diptera: Culicidae), the Major Vectors of Filariasis in a Rural Area of South India
Host Plant Preference of Mansonia Mosquitoes

annulifera
Insects described in 1901